Three warships of Japan have been named Kumano:

 , a  launched in 1936 and sunk in 1944
 , a  launched in 1975 and stricken in 2001
 , a  launched in 2020 and is being fitted out.

Japanese Navy ship names